Dasyuris transaurea is a species of moth in the family Geometridae. It is endemic to New Zealand.

Taxonomy 
This species was first described by George Howes in 1912 and named Dasyuris transaureus.

Description
Howes described this species as follows:

Distribution
This species is endemic to New Zealand.

References

Larentiinae
Moths of New Zealand
Moths described in 1912
Endemic fauna of New Zealand
Taxa named by George Howes (entomologist)
Endemic moths of New Zealand